Orange Mittai (Orange Candy) is a 2015 Indian Tamil language comedy film co-written and directed by Biju Viswanath. Produced by actor Vijay Sethupathi, the film stars him alongside Ramesh Thilak, Aashritha, Arumughan Bala and Karunakaran. The film began production in mid-2014.
The Movie was released in India and abroad on 31 July 2015.
The film had its Festival premiere at the 20th Busan International Film Festival,
The movie was released on Netflix in October 2018.

Plot 
Sathya (Ramesh Thilak) is a paramedic with an emergency ambulance service. On the anniversary of his father's death, Sathya and the ambulance driver are to retrieve an old man who claims to be critically ill. The patient, Kailasam (Vijay Sethupathi), boards the vehicle. His earlier claim to be fighting for his life is not apparent, although he has a heart condition. Kailasam's grumpy and obstinate nature causes trouble to the crew as they journey to find a hospital that suites his needs. Who is Kailasam? What does he want? What is the cause behind his adamant nature? The answers to these questions form the crux of the story. The old man needs to find a hospital that will have him, but it is a long way to go. The only way to find out what the universe has planned is to make the journey, and sometimes the journey is the destination.

Cast

 Vijay Sethupathi as Kailasam
 Ramesh Thilak as Sathya
 Arumughan Bala as Arumugam
 Aashritha as Kavya
 Karunakaran as Kailasam's son
 Trichy Manivannan as Kavya's father
 David Solomon Raja as Sub-Inspector
 Vishalini as Doctor
 Vinod Sagar as Drunkard suicidal man 
 Ashok Selvan in a guest appearance as Hospital paramedic
 Bobby Simha as Supervisor (Voice)

Production
Actor Vijay Sethupathi launched his production, Orange Mittai, in February 2014 and signed up director Biju Viswanath to direct the venture. The film was said to feature an ensemble cast including Jayaprakash, Ramesh Thilak, Aru Bala and Aashritha, with Vijay Sethupathi stating he would not play a role.

However, in July 2014, Vijay Sethupathi revealed that he would play a 55-year-old man in the film and promotional stills were released, replacing Jayaprakash in the character. He was also making a debut as a dialogue writer with this film. The team shot in Ambasamuthiram and other places surrounding Tirunelveli and Papanasam in South Tamil Nadu.

Soundtrack
The film's soundtrack was composed by Justin Prabhakaran, who had earlier produced the music for Sethupathi's Pannaiyarum Padminiyum. The soundtrack album, which was released on 1 July 2015, features four tracks, of which two were written and sung by Vijay Sethupathi himself.

Marketing and release

The first teaser of the film was released on 26 November 2014. In June 2015, a promo of the song "Straigh Ah Poyee" was released. A second trailer was released on 3 July 2015.

Orange Mittai had its worldwide theatrical release on 31 July 2015. The satellite rights of the film were bagged by Jaya TV.

Reception
The film received positive reviews from critics. S. Saraswathi from Rediff.com gave the film 3.5 out of 5 stars and wrote, "Like the candy it is named after, Orange Mittai with its sweet and sour moments, is a beautifully narrated film with just the right balance of humour and emotions." Nandita Ravi from The Times of India gave it 3 stars out of 5 and wrote, "Overall, like an orange mittai, the film too is bittersweet. The biggest plus of the film is its run time - a mere one hour and forty minutes, which seems to be more than enough to narrate this interesting story. The film ends on the note that "the journey is the destination", which about sums up the feeling that you get while watching this film". Baradwaj Rangan writing for The Hindu called Orange Mittai "a quiet ode to the bittersweet life". Hindustan Times gave a 3.5 rating out of 5 stating, "This old-age loneliness tale is a must-see". Behindwoods wrote "What strikes in Biju Viswanth's Orange Mittai is it is not preachy and there is no melodrama anywhere even if there is scope for one. The humor just glides through and enjoyable". India Glitz wrote "Orange Mittai is a simple feel good movie without much fuss and hype silently will enter into your hearts and leave with a small mark".

References

External links
 
 

2010s Tamil-language films
2015 films
Indian road comedy-drama films
Films scored by Justin Prabhakaran
2015 directorial debut films
2010s road comedy-drama films
2015 comedy-drama films